The Woodward Corridor is the stretch of neighborhoods and suburban communities located along Woodward Avenue within metropolitan Detroit, Michigan. Woodward Avenue is often called Detroit's Main Street. Woodward starts in the center of Downtown Detroit and ends in Downtown Pontiac.

Detroit neighborhoods located along the Woodward Corridor

Arden Park, Boston-Edison, Brush Park, Cass Corridor, Chaldean Town, Cultural Center, Downtown, Green Acres, Foxtown, Midtown, Milwaukee Junction, New Center, North End, Grixdale Farms, Palmer Woods.

Suburban communities located along the Woodward Corridor
Berkley, Birmingham, Bloomfield Hills, Bloomfield Township, Ferndale, Huntington Woods, Pleasant Ridge, Pontiac, and Royal Oak.

See also

M-1 Rail Line
Woodward Dream Cruise

External links
 Detroit Corridor Initiative
 M-1 Rail
 Transform Woodward Project

Metro Detroit
Neighborhoods in Detroit
Geography of Macomb County, Michigan
Geography of Oakland County, Michigan
Geography of Wayne County, Michigan